Francis Higgins was a U.S. soccer goalkeeper who spent two seasons in the American Soccer League and an unknown number in the Southern New England Soccer League.

Higgins’ career details are sketchy.  He appears to have spent most of it with teams based in Fall River, Massachusetts.  In April 1920, he backstopped the Fall River Rovers of the Southern New England Soccer League in a 2-1 loss to Fore River in the 1920 National Challenge Cup semifinals.  In 1922, he signed with the Fall River Marksmen of the American Soccer League.  That season he split time in the goal with Tommy Whalen.  It is unknown what teams he played for from 1923 to 1925.  In 1925, he signed with the New Bedford Whalers.  He played only five games before leaving the team and league.

References

American soccer players
American Soccer League (1921–1933) players
Fall River Marksmen players
Fall River Rovers players
New Bedford Whalers players
Southern New England Soccer League players
Association football goalkeepers